Lynn Bernard Nelson (February 24, 1905 – February 15, 1955) was an American professional baseball pitcher. He played in Major League Baseball (MLB) from 1933 to 1940 for the Chicago Cubs, Philadelphia Athletics, and Detroit Tigers.

Nelson was good with the bat, posting a .281 batting average (103-for-367) with 42 runs, 5 home runs and 55 RBI in 268 games. He also played 6 games at left field.

External links

Major League Baseball pitchers
Chicago Cubs players
Philadelphia Athletics players
Detroit Tigers players
Burlington Bees players
Kansas City Blues (baseball) players
Lincoln Links players
Los Angeles Angels (minor league) players
Seattle Indians players
Atlanta Crackers players
Memphis Chickasaws players
Buffalo Bisons (minor league) players
Syracuse Chiefs players
Baseball players from North Dakota
People from Ransom County, North Dakota
1905 births
1955 deaths